In terms of property damage, 2017 was the most destructive wildfire season on record in California at the time, surpassed by only the 2018 season and the 2020 season, with a total of 9,560 fires burning  of land, according to the California Department of Forestry and Fire Protection, including five of the 20 most destructive wildland-urban interface fires in the state's history. Throughout 2017, the fires destroyed or damaged more than 10,000 structures in the state (destroyed 9,470, damaged 810), a higher tally than the previous nine years combined. State data showed that the large wildfires killed 47 people – 45 civilians and 2 firefighters – almost higher than the previous 10 years combined. The total property damage and total amount of burned land were both surpassed by the 2018 California wildfires.

Throughout the early months of 2017, there was heavy rainfall over most of California, which triggered widespread flooding, thus temporarily mitigating the state's historic drought conditions. However, according to a report published by the National Interagency Fire Center, the potential for large fires was "expected to remain near normal through the spring, but once fine fuels dry out, there will likely be a spike in grass fire activity."

In December 2017, strong Santa Ana winds triggered a new round of wildfires, including the massive Thomas Fire in Ventura County. At the time, the Thomas Fire was California's largest modern wildfire, which has since been surpassed by the Mendocino Complex's Ranch Fire in 2018.

During the year, 5 of the 20 most destructive wildfires in the state's history burned between October and December: #1 Tubbs, #6 Nuns, #7 Thomas, #11 Atlas, and #17 Redwood Valley. The wildfires collectively caused at least $18.0 billion (2018 USD) in damages, including $13.2 billion in insured losses, $3 billion in other economic losses, and $1.8 billion in fire suppression costs, making the 2017 California fires the second-costliest on record. The total economic cost, including fire suppression, insurance, direct and indirect economic losses, and recovery expenditures is estimated at about $180 billion (2017 USD). This number includes economic harm to the wine industry, where several wineries in Napa and Sonoma were destroyed, and where many wine grapes were severely damaged by smoke. Cal Fire spent $700 million during fiscal year 2017, far exceeding the approximately $426 million the agency had budgeted that year for fire suppression. This made 2017 the most expensive firefighting year on record in California state history.

According to the National Oceanic and Atmospheric Administration, 2017 will be remembered as a year of extremes. It was the third-warmest year on record for the United States, and it was the second-hottest in California, bringing to the surface the question of long-term climate change and its contribution to the 2017 California fires. The hotter temperatures dry out vegetation, making them easier to burn, predisposing vulnerable regions like California to more wildfires in the coming decades as temperatures continue to rise and rainfall continues to decline. Historically, it has been estimated that prior to 1850, about 4.5 million acres (17,000 km²) burned yearly, in fires that lasted for months.

Wildfire maps
This section contains maps of the locations and burn areas of the fires that occurred during the largest outbreaks of the season. The burn areas of some major fires are included in some of the maps.

Wildfires 
Below is a list of all fires that exceeded  during the 2017 California wildfire season, as well as the fires that caused significant damage. The information is taken from CAL FIRE's list of large fires, and other sources where indicated.

October Northern California wildfires

During the month of October, a series of wildfires broke out throughout Napa, Lake, Sonoma, Mendocino, and Butte counties during severe fire weather conditions, effectively leading to a major red flag warning from much of the northern California area. In the extreme conditions, small fires quickly grew to become massive conflagrations spanning from 1,000 to well over 20,000 acres within a single day.

December Southern California wildfires

Multiple wildfires ignited in December across Los Angeles, San Bernardino, Ventura, San Diego, Riverside, Santa Barbara Counties. The fires were exacerbated by unusually powerful and long-lasting Santa Ana winds, we had no rain in sight, cause of the drought, it has been driest December years ever record since 1989, and 1999. as well as large amounts of dry vegetation grown, due to large amounts of precipitation earlier in the year. California Governor Jerry Brown declared a state of emergency in Ventura and Los Angeles Counties, and Los Angeles Mayor Eric Garcetti declared a state of emergency for the city. The largest fire was the Thomas Fire, which grew to 281,893 acres, becoming California's largest modern wildfire at the time, since surpassed by the Mendocino Complex's Ranch Fire in 2018.

See also

 List of California wildfires
 May 2014 San Diego County wildfires
 2008 California wildfires
 October 2007 California wildfires
 2017 California floods
 Climate change in California

References

External links

 2017 Statewide Fire Map, Google
 2017 California fires information  - CalFire

 
California, 2017
2017